"Fortress Around Your Heart" is a hit single released from Sting's 1985 debut solo album The Dream of the Blue Turtles. It was released as the album's third single in the UK, and the second single in the US.

The song was later included on the U.S. release of the Fields of Gold: The Best of Sting 1984–1994 compilation album.

Song information
"Fortress Around Your Heart" was inspired by Sting's divorce.  The pain he felt at the collapse of his first marriage led him to write some of his biggest hits, including "Every Breath You Take" and "King of Pain".  Sting wrote the song in the studio in Barbados in 1985.  The song features a Branford Marsalis sax solo. In a Musician magazine interview later that year, Sting said:

"Fortress" is about appeasement, about trying to bridge the gaps between individuals.  The central image is a minefield that you've laid around this other person to try and protect them. Then you realize that you have to walk back through it.  I think it's one of the best choruses I've ever written.

During one of Sting's first performances of the song in concert in Paris, his crew lowered a tiny fortress onto the stage in a parody of the similar Stonehenge scene from the film This Is Spinal Tap.

Reception
Billboard said that the single is "challenging, complex and rather difficult," with "mysterious poetic imagery" and a melody that is "more recitative than hook."  Cash Box said that the song illustrated Sting's "genius as songwriter," although it is "tinged with melancholy" and "less jazzy and more Police-like than Sting's previous US single, "If You Love Somebody Set Them Free."

Single release
The song was also released as a single, and reached #8 and #49 on the U.S. and U.K. singles charts, respectively. It also reached #1 for two weeks on the Billboard Top Rock Tracks chart, becoming his second consecutive #1 hit on this chart.

Charts

Weekly charts

Year-end

References

Sting (musician) songs
1985 singles
Songs written by Sting (musician)
A&M Records singles
1985 songs